Ian Akin (born July 28, 1959, in California) is a comic book artist, known primarily for inking. Along with his inking partner, Brian Garvey, Akin worked on many superhero comics (mostly for Marvel Comics) from 1982 to 1988.

Biography
Akin grew up in southern California, in Riverside County. At age 13, he and his mother and sister moved to San Francisco.

Akin's first professional job was producing artwork for Larry Fuller's New Funny Book in 1978. Around this time he met Brian Garvey, who shortly joined Akin's small, San Francisco-based studio.

Akin & Garvey
In 1982, Akin began his ten-year partnership with Garvey, inking for Marvel Comics on ROM Spaceknight #34 (Sept. 1982), over Sal Buscema's pencils. Akin & Garvey became the regular ROM inkers for almost two years, until 1984. During that time, they also provided the inks for the 1982 Marvel mini-series The Vision and the Scarlet Witch. In 1984, the pair inked the four-issue mini-series Starriors and issue four of the mini-series The Transformers for Marvel. The pair  inked issues #190–209 of Iron Man, as well as three years working on The Transformers.

In the mid-1980s, the pair branched out, producing work for DC Comics, where they worked on comics including Firestorm (for five consecutive issues) and The Warlord; Pacific Comics; and Savage Graphics, while continuing to produce covers and interior art for Marvel. Akin & Garvey worked for Continuity Comics between 1986 and 1992, on titles including Megalith, Ms. Mystic and Samuree.

In the early 1990s, Akin (and Garvey) produced work for Disney Comics, on titles featuring Jessica Rabbit and The Little Mermaid, and others. The inking duo disbanded in 1992 to pursue separate projects.

In the early 2010s, Akin and Garvey reunited to do commercial illustration and comics work.

Solo work
Between 1994 and 1995, Akin produced covers for Disney Digest reprints, including for Darkwing Duck. He continued to produce work steadily for Marvel through the 1990s, notably as the regular inker on Marvel's Darkhawk from 1993 to 1995, and Professor Xavier and the X-Men from 1995 to 1997. He was a regular inker on the 1990s incarnation of What If..., but since the mid-1990s, Akin has no significant published credits.

Select bibliography

Akin & Garvey
 Rom #34, 36–50 (Marvel)
 The Vision and the Scarlet Witch #1–4 (Marvel)
 Starriors #1-4 (Marvel)
 Firestorm #38–42 (DC)
 Iron Man #190–209 (Marvel)
 Transformers: Headmasters #1–4 (Marvel)
 The Transformers #19–30, 32, 35–37 (Marvel)

Solo
 Darkhawk #28–50 (Marvel)
 Professor Xavier and the X-Men #2, 5, 7, 8, 10–13, 15–18 (Marvel)

Notes

References

 
 Ian Akin at the Disney Database

External links 
 

1959 births
Living people
American comics artists
Comics inkers